Lieutenant-Commander Douglas Alan Clark (May 26, 1917 – August 6, 2012) was an American fighter pilot who received the Navy Cross for his actions while commanding Fighting Squadron THIRTY (VF-30), attached to the USS Belleau Wood (CVL-24), on 21 March 1945.  While on combat air patrol he directed his squadron to attack an enemy formation of Japanese bombers which was heavily protected by fighters.  Even though his squadron was significantly outnumbered they were able to shoot down over 40 enemy aircraft in 30 minutes without suffering one loss.  Clark himself shot down one enemy fighter and damaged another during the confrontation.  His quick action and the superiority of his squadron turned back what would surely have been a devastating attack on his carrier group.

Along with the Navy Cross Capt Clark (rank at retirement) received three Distinguished Flying Crosses, five Air Medals, a Navy and Marine Corps Commendation Medal during his time in combat in the Pacific Theater as Naval Aviator. After the war he took part in the development of the Navy's jet fighter program, as well as served in the Pentagon.

Clark retired from the U.S. Navy in 1963, and moved to south Florida where he lived until his death on August 6, 2012, at the age of 95. He was scheduled to be buried in Arlington National Cemetery with full military honors.

Medals and Accolades 
Lieutenant Commander Douglas Alan Clark received the following medals

References

External links
 Military Awards for Valor - Top 3 (U.S. Dept of Defense)
 Military Times "Hall of Valor" - AWARDS AND CITATIONS
 Home of Heroes - Recipients of Navy Cross, WWII
 United States Naval Academy

1917 births
2012 deaths
Recipients of the Navy Cross (United States)
Recipients of the Distinguished Flying Cross (United States)
Recipients of the Air Medal
Burials at Arlington National Cemetery
United States Navy personnel of World War II